Old Armenian Town in Fresno, California, is a former enclave of Armenian immigrants.  Community gathering places include the Armenian Community Center on Ventura Street and the Holy Trinity Armenian Apostolic Church.  There are also restaurants and delis that specialize in Armenian food.

As of 2020, there were plans to redevelop the area. The new project, also dubbed "Old Armenian Town" is to contain a courthouse for California's Fifth Appellate District Court of Appeals, a major multi-story commercial office building, and an Armenian Museum.

See also 
 Armenian Americans
 List of Armenian ethnic enclaves

References

External links
Old Armenian Town page on Downtown Fresno website

Neighborhoods in Fresno, California
Armenian-American culture in California
Armenian diaspora communities in the United States
Restaurant districts and streets in the United States